The 2022 Men's EuroHockey Junior Championship III was the 11th edition of the Men's EuroHockey Junior Championship III, the third level of the men's European under-21 field hockey championships organized by the European Hockey Federation. It was held at the Helsinki Velodrome in Helsinki, Finland from 26 to 30 July 2022.

Switzerland won their second Men's EuroHockey Junior Championship III title by defeating Ukraine 3–2 in the final and were promoted to the EuroHockey Junior Championship II in 2024. Lithuania won the bronze medal by defeating the hosts Finland 12–2.

Preliminary round

Pool A

Classification round

Third place match

Final

Final standings

See also
 2022 Men's EuroHockey Junior Championship II
 2022 Women's EuroHockey Junior Championship III

References

Men's EuroHockey Junior Championship III
Junior III
International field hockey competitions hosted by Finland
EuroHockey Junior Championship III
EuroHockey Junior Championship III
International sports competitions in Helsinki
2020s in Helsinki